Samlout is a khum (commune) of Samlout District in Battambang Province in north-western Cambodia.

It is the principal town of Samlout District.

Villages

 Chhar RoKar
 Kantuot
 Ou Chrab
 Samlout
 Srae Andoung Muy
 Bueng Run

References

Communes of Battambang province
Samlout District